Pettiford is the surname of the following people:
Jack Pettiford (1919–1964), Australian cricketer
Kenneth Pettiford (born 1950), American college football player and coach
Keith Pettiford (1915–1942), Australian rugby football player
Oscar Pettiford (1922–1960), American jazz double bassist, cellist and composer
Valarie Pettiford (born 1960), American stage and television actress, dancer, and jazz singer 
William R. Pettiford (1847–1914), American banker 

English-language surnames